Atatürk and Şerife Bacı Monument is a monument in Kastamonu, Turkey.

Geography

Atatürk and Şerife Bacı
Atatürk (1881–1938) was the founder of the Turkish Republic. He was also the high commander of the Turkish army in the Turkish War of Independence (1919–1923).

Şerife Bacı (literally Sister Şerife) (1900–1921) was a heroine in the Turkish War of Independence. She was a village woman from Seydiler, who took part in the arms transportation service. Any weapon or ammunition from İstanbul to İnebolu port  (Kastamonu Province) had to be forwarded to Ankara by ox wagons. Since most of the men were drafted women were responsible in transportation. In 1921 December Şerife with her new born baby volunteered to drive a wagon in the convoy.  But she froze to death in the harsh winder conditions. Later it was revealed that  she had laid her own coat over the ammunition. Her baby was rescued.

The monument
In 1985 Kastamonu governor decided to erect a monument about Şerife Bacı. The monument was created by Professor Tankut Öktem (1940–2007) of the Marmara University in 1990. In 2005 the dais was renewed by using a basalt platform. The monument is actually a group of figures. These are Atatürk,  Şerife Bacı, ox wagon and various soldiers.

See also
Atatürk monuments and memorials

References

Kastamonu
Statues of Mustafa Kemal Atatürk
1990 establishments in Turkey
Monuments and memorials to women
Monuments and memorials to the Turkish War of Independence